is a Japanese football player. He plays for FC Osaka.

Playing career
Wataru Ikenaga joined to Renofa Yamaguchi FC in 2014. In 2016, he moved to MIO Biwako Shiga, but then he changed club, signing for FC Osaka in January 2017.

Club statistics
Updated to 20 February 2017.

References

External links
Profile at FC Osaka

1991 births
Living people
Osaka University of Health and Sport Sciences alumni
Association football people from Hyōgo Prefecture
Japanese footballers
J3 League players
Japan Football League players
Renofa Yamaguchi FC players
MIO Biwako Shiga players
FC Osaka players
Association football defenders